Michelsneukirchen is a municipality in Oberpfälzer district of Cham in Bavaria in Germany.

Geographical Facts

Geographical position
The village is located in the Bavarian Forest.

Adjoining Municipalities
Adjoining municipalities are Schorndorf, Falkenstein, Obertrübenbach and in  Zinzenzell in Niederbayern.

Structuring of the Community
There are several small villages in Michelsneukirchen, for example Dörfling, Woppmannsdorf, Momannsfelden, Regelsmais and Ponholz.

History
The village belonged to the masters of Falkenstein.

Crest
Michelsneukirchen's crest is "divided by red and gold; a silver flaming sword in front, three tilted lozenges in the back."

Gastronomic Specialties
Grandma's mushroom soup with dumplings and apple pie for dessert.

References

External links
 Tourismus Seite der Bauernhöfe in Michelsneukirchen
 Gemeinde Michelsneukirchen im Bayerischen Wald

Cham (district)